Capital Beat may refer to

 The Concord Monitor newspaper column by Eric Moskowitz and Sarah Liebowitz
 A fictional political television show in The West Wing hosted by Mark Gottfried